Filippini is an Italian surname. Notable people with the surname include:

Alberto Filippini (born 1987) Italian footballer
Alfredo Filippini (1924–2020) was an Italian sculptor, painter and illustrator.
André Filippini (1924–2013), Swiss bobsledder 
Ange Michel Filippini (1834–1887), French public servant, Governor of Cochinchina
Antonio Filippini (born 1973), Italian footballer 
Bruno Filippini (born 1945), Italian singer 
Eduardo Filippini (born 1983), Argentine footballer
Emanuele Filippini (born 1973), Italian footballer 
Francesco Filippini (1853–1895), Italian painter 
Gino Filippini (1900–1962), Italian composer
Jacques Filippini (born 1950), French rower
Lorenzo Filippini (born 1995), Italian footballer
Lucy Filippini (1672–1732), Italian pedagogue and co-founder of the current Religious Teachers Filippini
Marcelo Filippini (born 1967), Uruguayan tennis player 
Matt Filippini (born 1986), American entrepreneur, wine enthusiast of Italian descent 
Marco Filippini (born 1988), Italian footballer 
Nicholas Tonti-Filippini (1956–2014), Australian bioethicist 
Ramon Filippini (born 1928), Swedish former footballer of Italian descent 
Rocco Filippini (1943–2021), Italian classical cellist

See also
Oratorio dei Filippini, Rome
Church of the Philippine Fathers, Roman Catholic church located in Verona, Italy

Italian-language surnames
Patronymic surnames
Surnames from given names